Hadji Muhammad can refer to:

 The archaeological type site for the Middle Ubaid period (4800–4500 BC).
 A spelling of Piri Reis's birth name (ca. 1465 –1555).
 Hadji Muhammad a Pasha-Dey of Algiers (1815).